Lord Archibald Hamilton (17 March 1769 – 28 August 1827) was a Scottish politician.

Born in 1769 to Lady Harriet Stewart, and her husband, Lord Archibald Douglas-Hamilton, Hamilton matriculated at Christ Church, Oxford on 23 April 1788. He received his BA in 1792 and his MA in 1795. On 14 October 1790, he was admitted to Lincoln's Inn, and called to the bar in 1799.

He was elected Member of Parliament for Lanarkshire in 1802.

He served as MP for 26 years, opposing the governments of Addington and Pitt, and was an advocate of Burgh reform, something that would occur 8 years after his death with the Burgh Police (Scotland) Act, 1833

Hamilton was also Colonel of the Lanarkshire Militia and Lord Rector of the University of Glasgow in 1811.

References

External links 
 

1769 births
1827 deaths
Alumni of Christ Church, Oxford
Members of Lincoln's Inn
Members of the Parliament of the United Kingdom for Scottish constituencies
Politicians from Hamilton, South Lanarkshire
UK MPs 1802–1806
UK MPs 1806–1807
UK MPs 1807–1812
UK MPs 1812–1818
UK MPs 1818–1820
UK MPs 1820–1826
Younger sons of dukes